Born to Love You is a 2012 Filipino romantic film directed by Jerome Pabocan, starring Coco Martin and Angeline Quinto. The film was released under CineMedia and distributed by Star Cinema on May 30, 2012.

The film is Quinto's acting debut.

Plot 
The film centers around Joey Liwanag (Angeline Quinto), a poor girl who works as a part-time tourist guide for Koreans and likes joining amateur singing contests with her two younger siblings to help her family cope with financial problems. Despite the hardship and low probability, Joey works hard to save up money in order to go to Korea, and meet her real father who has abandoned her when she was very young.

Rex Manrique (Coco Martin) is a frustrated, very arrogant and hot-tempered photographer who is out to prove to the world that he can stand on his own feet and succeed in life independently. However, the ladder of success seems to be impossible for him as he faces different complications and rejections in life, as well as his career.

The moment Rex and Joey encountered each other in a Korean wedding, these two grew a big misunderstanding and hatred towards each other, making it hard for the two of them to get along in the first place. Things get more out of hand when Rex was hired in an advertising company where Joey was also working for—this time, as a translator. As they got to know each other, they found solace and comfort in each other's company. But the security that they found in each other soon starts to shake when life takes another course and drives them into a complicated situation. Joey finally meets her biological father, while Rex struggles finding acceptance and forgiveness for her Mother who abandoned her for another man when he was still a young boy. Although Rex cuts off their relationship, Joey tries everything that she could to help him go through his own challenges and promises Rex that she will never leave him. But when Rex finally figures out the answers to his questions and his purpose in life, he and Joey get into a car accident making Rex decide to leave Joey and his family behind and start a new life.

After a couple of years of investigation, Joey finally finds Rex in an island in Batangas and confronts him about their relationship which they broke off unofficially. At the same time, Joey finds out that Rex turned blind after saving her life in the accident and Rex himself found forgiveness in his heart. The movie ends during Rex and Joey's wedding celebration.

Cast

Main cast 
 Coco Martin as Rex Manrique
 Jairus Aquino as Young Rex Manrique
 Angeline Quinto as Joey Liwanag

Supporting cast 
 Albert Martinez as Charles Ronquillo
 Eula Valdez as Sylvia
 Al Tantay as Mario Liwanag
 Tonton Gutierrez as Rex's father
 Malou de Guzman as Ampie Liwanag
 Kiray Celis as Sampaguita Liwanag
 Amy Nobleza as Corrita Liwanag
 Eda Nolan as Jam
 Mickey Ferriols as Bianca
 Louise Abuel as Brian
 Ryan Bang
 Manuel Aquino as Ku Aquino
 David Chua
 Jojit Lorenzo
 Aloy Noranda
 Chris Pasturan
 Jenny Kim
 Richard Quan
 Andre Tiangco

Box office 
"Born to Love You" earned  in its opening day.

References

External links 
 
 
 
 Born to Love You Official ABS-CBN Forum and Messageboard

2012 films
Filipino-language films
2010s Korean-language films
Star Cinema romance films
Philippine romance films
2012 romance films